Pilot Knob is an unincorporated community in southern Travis County, Texas, United States. The community is centered on the intersection of US 183 and Farm to Market Road 812 and is named for Pilot Knob, the remnant hill of an extinct volcano. The area is semi-rural with residences on large lots or acreage and convenience stores and other small businesses.

References

External links

Unincorporated communities in Texas
Unincorporated communities in Travis County, Texas